The ATX Open is a women's tennis event held in Austin, Texas, United States. The first edition took place in February 2023. The ATX Open is part of the WTA Tour and is listed as a WTA 250 tournament. The tournament was awarded to Austin in March 2022.

The tournament is held at the Westwood Country Club on eleven outdoor hardcourts. The tournament's host sponsors are Formentera Partners and Helmerich & Payne.

Past finals

Singles

Doubles

See also
 Defunct Texas Tennis Open

References

WTA Tour
Tennis tournaments in Texas
Hard court tennis tournaments
2023 establishments in Texas